BIG Tamil Entertainment Award is an accolade presented by the Reliance Broadcast Network Limited under three broad categories: Television, Film, Arts. Part of the BIG Regional Entertainment Awards, the awards were presented first in 2011 for the best of 2010. The ceremony was held on 26 March 2011. The media partner was The Hindu and the broadcast partner was Vijay TV. The winners were elected by people's voting.

Ceremonies

Categories and Winners of 2011

Awards for Excellence in Art

Most Entertaining Classical Dancer of the Decade - Padma Subramanyam
Most Entertaining Bharathanatyam Dancer  - Kamal Haasan

Awards for Excellence in Films

Most Entertaining Debut Actor - Vidharth for Mynaa
Most Entertaining Actor - Silambarasan for  Vinnaithaandi Varuvaaya 
Most Entertaining Actress - Tamannaah for Paiyaa
Most Entertaining Director - Rajesh for Boss Engira Bhaskaran
Most Entertaining Film - Boss Engira Bhaskaran
Most Entertaining Villain - Venkatesh for Angaadi Theru
Most Entertaining Music Director - Yuvan Shankar Raja for Paiyaa
Most Entertaining Female Playback Singer - Chinmayi for Poove Poove from Siddu +2
Most Entertaining Male Playback Singer - Vijay Prakash for Hosanna from Vinnaithaandi Varuvaaya
Most Entertaining Lyricist - Na. Muthukumar

Awards for Excellence in Television

Most Entertaining Tele Serial - Thekkathi Ponnu from Kalaignar TV
Most Entertaining Television Actor - Sanjeev for Thirumathi Selvam from Sun TV
Most Entertaining Television Actress - Devayani for Kodi Mullai from Raj TV
Most Entertaining Television Villain (Male) - Venu Arvind for Arasi from Sun TV
Most Entertaining Television Villain (Female) - Brinda Das for Anandham from Sun TV
Most Entertaining Talk Show - Neeya Naana from Vijay TV
Most Entertaining Reality Show Host - Gopinath for Neeya Naana form Vijay TV
Most Entertaining Theatre Group - Koothu-P-Pattarai

Special Award

Entertainment Phenomenon - Rajinikanth

See also

 List of Asian television awards

References

External links
 Winners List

Tamil film awards
Indian television awards